Campeonísimo was the title given to exceptional champions in Mexican football from 1907 to 1996, who won both the Copa MX and the League title on the same year.

History
In the early Mexican championships, the clubs used to play a yearly tournament. The professional era began in Mexico in 1944, but there was a tournament that had been played since the early 1900s, the Copa Mexico, also known as the Tower Cup. A club that won both the Copa Mexico and the League title would then be known as campeonísimos.

There are only five clubs who achieved this. Club León was the first to obtain this prestigious title in 1949. Guadalajara obtained theirs in 1957 Cruz Azul achieved this in the 1969–1970 championships. Club Puebla obtained it in the 1989–1990 championships, winning the League title against the Leones Negros and the Copa Mexico against UANL Tigres. Necaxa was the last to achieve this title in 1994.

At the end of the 1995 championship, the Federation decided to play short tournament with a closed and an open tournament, thus the Copa Mexico could not be played and was forgotten, ending the list of teams to achieve campeonísimo.

The Campeonisimo name title could still hypothetically be given due to the participation of Mexican clubs in the revived Copa MX, FIFA Club World Cup and CONCACAF Champions League. The feat was achieved by Guadalajara in the Clausura 2017 season, after winning their 4th Copa MX title against Monarcas Morelia, and their 12th league title against Tigres UANL.

Footnotes

Football in Mexico